Nebo Zovyot (translit. Nebo zovyot, lit. The Sky Beckons or The Heavens Beckon) is a Soviet science-fiction feature film, produced by Aleksandr Kozyr and Mikhail Karyukov, and filmed at the Dovzhenko Film Studios in 1959.

It premiered September 12, 1959.

Synopsis 
A Soviet scientific expedition is being prepared as the world's first mission to planet Mars. Their space ship Homeland has been built at a space station, where the expedition awaits the command to start.

An American ship Typhoon experiencing mechanical problems arrives at the same space station, secretly having the same plans for the conquest of the Red Planet. Trying to stay ahead of the Soviets, they start without proper preparation, and soon are again in distress.

The Homeland changes course to save the crew of Typhoon. They succeed, but find that their fuel reserves are now insufficient to get to Mars. So Homeland makes an emergency landing on the asteroid Icarus passing near Mars, on which they are stranded.

After an attempt to send a fuel supply by unmanned rocket fails, another ship Meteor is sent with a cosmonaut on a possibly suicidal mission, to save the stranded cosmonauts.

Cast 
 Ivan Pereverzev — scientist Eugene Kornev
 Alexander Shvoryn — engineer Andrey Gordienko
 Constantine Bartashevich — astronaut Robert Clark
 Gurgen Tonunts — astronaut Erwin Verst
 Valentin Chernyak — cosmonaut Gregory Somov
 Viktor Dobrovolsky — space station chief Vasily Demchenko
 Alexandra "Alla" Popova — Vera Korneva
 Taisia Litvinenko — doctor Lena
 Larisa Borisenko — student Olga
 Leo Lobov — cameraman Sasha
 Sergey Filimonov — writer Troyan
 Maria Samoilov — Clark's mother
 Mikhail Belousov — ( uncredited )

Crew 

 Screenwriters — Alexei Sazonov, Evgeniya Pomeschikovwith the participation of — Mikhael Karyukov
 Consultants — corresponding Member of the USSR Academy of Sciences — Abnir Yakovkin, Engineer Aleksandr Borin 
 Production Director - Valeri Fokin
 Story Editors — Renata Korol, A. Pereguda
 Staging directors — Mikhael Karyukov, Aleksandr Kozyr
 Art director - Tatiana Kulchitskaya
 Chief Artist — Timofej Liauchuk
 Sets director — Yuri Shvets
 Costume Artist — G. Glinkova
 Makeup artist — E. Odinovich
 Special Effects Directors — Franz Semyannikov, N. Ilyushin
 Special Effects Art Directors — Yuri Shvets, G. Loukashov
 Director of photography — Nikolai Kulchitskii
 Sound engineer — Georgij Parahnikov
 Film Editor — L. Mkhitaryants
 Composer — Julij Meitus
 USSR State OrchestraConductor — Veniamin Tolba
 Экспериментальный ансамбль электромузыкальных инструментов(Experimental Electronic Music Ensemble)Orchestra Director — Vyacheslav Mescherin

U.S. version 

In 1962, Roger Corman invited film school student Francis Ford Coppola to produce an English-language version of the film, rights to which Corman had acquired for U.S. release, to be called Battle Beyond the Sun.  In addition to preparing a dubbing script in American English, Coppola removed all references to the US/Soviet conflict from the dialogue, blotted out all the Cyrillic writing on the various spacecraft and superimposed neutral designs, replaced shots showing models and paintings of Soviet spacecraft with scenes showing NASA ones, replaced the names of all the actors with made-up names which had their first letters identical to those of the players (and thus turning Taisiya Litvinenko into a man, Thomas Littleton), and inserted a scene with monsters on Mars's moon Phobos. In all, the resulting film is 13 minutes shorter than the original. The film was distributed by American International Pictures.

Some space scenes from Nebo Zovyot also appear in Corman's 1965 film Voyage to the Prehistoric Planet. (Most of the scenes in that film are taken from another Soviet science-fiction film, Planeta Bur).

Related facts 
Nebo Zovyot was released two years after the launch of the first artificial satellite Sputnik 1 and two years before the first manned flight into space by Yuri Gagarin.

Stanley Kubrick's 1968 film 2001: A Space Odyssey used drawings and graphics solutions from Nebo Zovyot created by the fiction artist Yuri Shvets.

Nebo Zovyot was re-released in Germany as Der Himmel ruft on June 15, 2009. Furthermore, the film was officially translated into Hungarian and Italian.

In the film the fictional Soviet spaceship Rodina (Motherland) landed vertically on floating landing platform in Yalta harbour, similar to SpaceX CRS-8 landing on April 8, 2016, (with SpaceX having successfully accomplished their first vertical landing recovery of a first stage booster as a return to launch site during Flight 20 of Falcon 9 on December 21, 2015).

References

External links 
 

1950s science fiction films
Soviet science fiction films
Dovzhenko Film Studios films
Films about astronauts
Mars in film
Space adventure films
Films scored by Yuliy Meitus
Hard science fiction films